J. J. Hilder (23 July 1881 – 10 April 1916), also known as Jesse Jewhurst Hilder, was an Australian watercolourist.

Early life
Hilder was born in Toowoomba, Queensland, Australia, the fourth son and eighth child of Henry Hilder, an engineer originally from Sussex. Hilder attended Toowoomba North State School until 1890 when his family moved to Brisbane where he continued his education at Fortitude Valley State School. Winning a scholarship when 13 years of age, Hilder spent three years at the Brisbane Grammar School and passed the junior public examination in 1897.

In 1898 Hilder joined the Brisbane branch of the Bank of New South Wales. In 1901 he was transferred to Goulburn, and the following year to Bega, on the south coast of New South Wales, where he joined some friends in weekend sketching. Later on he was to receive £1 for one of these sketches, his first sale. Suffering increasing ill-health he moved on a number of occasions. Hilder was transferred to a Sydney suburb, but the sea air did not suit him; he was diagnosed with tuberculosis. During the next five years he had to obtain leave of absence from the bank several times.

Career
In 1906 Hilder asked Julian Ashton for advice about his art work and received encouragement he undertook classes at the Ashton's art school and had practice in drawing which he realized was his weak point. Towards the end of 1906 Hilder went to a sanatorium in Queensland for four months, but came back little improved in health. At his own request he was transferred to a branch west of the mountains in April 1907. In August 1907 he sent 21 watercolours to an exhibition of the Society of Artists, Sydney. They were priced very low, from three to five guineas, and 19 were sold. These works created a sensation among the artists and critics. Hilder's health continued to be very bad and he kept moving about seeking vainly for improvement. He was able to do some painting, and at the spring exhibition of the Society of Artists his 14 watercolours were all sold.

Early in 1909 Hilder was married to Phyllis Meadmore, a probationer nurse. He had told her frankly about the state of his health but it was decided to take the risk. Later that same year Hilder the Bank of New South Wales accepted his resignation, and paid him nine months' leaving salary. He was grateful to his employers for the consideration he had received during his many years of ill-health. A cottage was taken at Epping in the hills a few miles from Sydney, and during the next two years Hilder and his wife went through many anxieties. His sales were uncertain and his prices were low. Increasingly focused on his artwork, Hilder began to find more patronage and sales, and exhibited in Melbourne in 1914. Despite continued ill-health he painted throughout the remaining two years of his life, dying on 10 April 1916, at Hornsby, New South Wales, Australia. His elder son was sculptor Bim Hilder. His younger son was artist and author Brett Hilder, although Brett is better known as a Master Mariner.

Legacy
Hilder was modest, shy and affected by illness; this sometimes led to estrangement from his best friends. He was fortunate in his wife, in the admiration of his fellow artists, and in finding early buyers of his paintings. He was very critical of his own work and tore up much of it; sometimes the final result was the third or fourth effort to capture the subject. He was not afraid of empty spaces and everything in the drawing was beautifully placed. His colour was always excellent, though some of his later work is painted almost in monochrome washed in on very rough paper. The treatment generally is broad, yet full of refinement and poetical feeling. The best collection of his work will be found at the national gallery at Sydney. He is also represented at the Melbourne, Adelaide and other galleries. The Ewing collection at the University of Melbourne has a good example, "The Island Trader". Ure Smith published a tribute, J. J. Hilder: Watercolourist (1916), with proceeds going to Hilder's widow.

Publications
J. J. (Jesse Jewhurst) Hilder, J.J. Hilder: water-colourist (Sydney: Tyrrells, 1916)
Sydney Ure Smith and Bertram Stevens (eds.), The art of J.J. Hilder (Sydney: Angus & Robertson, 1918)
J. J. (Jesse Jewhurst) Hilder, Jesse Jewhurst Hilder: anniversary exhibition, 1966 (Brisbane: Queensland Art Gallery, 1960)

Notes

References

External links
 

1881 births
1916 deaths
Australian watercolourists
20th-century Australian painters
Julian Ashton Art School alumni